Nils Pichinot (born 29 August 1989) is a German professional footballer who plays as a forward.

Career
Pichinot began his professional career with FC St. Pauli in 2009, and made his debut in a DFB-Pokal first round victory over FC 08 Villingen, as a substitute for Rouwen Hennings. He scored in his only league appearance for the club, a last-minute winning goal in a 2–1 win over Rot-Weiss Ahlen, after coming on as a substitute for Florian Bruns.

For the remainder of his time at St. Pauli, Pichinot played regularly for the reserve team, before signing for Carl Zeiss Jena in January 2011, where he spent 18 months, leaving in 2012 after they were relegated from the 3. Liga to sign for Hallescher FC, who had been promoted to the third tier. He moved alongside Pierre Becken, who had also been a teammate of his at St. Pauli. After one season with Halle he signed for Goslarer SC 08. A year later he moved on again, to Wacker Nordhausen.

References

External links
 

1989 births
Living people
German footballers
Footballers from Hamburg
Association football forwards
FC St. Pauli players
FC Carl Zeiss Jena players
Hallescher FC players
Goslarer SC 08 players
FSV Wacker 90 Nordhausen players
KSV Hessen Kassel players
2. Bundesliga players
3. Liga players
Regionalliga players